The 1981 Junior Pot Black was the first staging of the junior snooker tournament which was held in the Pebble Mill Studios in Birmingham. 12 young players were competing in a qualifying round before 6 of the winners go on to the round-robin stage of 2 groups of three. The matches are one-frame shoot-outs and 2 frame aggregate scores in the final.

Broadcasts were on BBC2 and started at 18:55 on Friday 1 May 1981  Alan Weeks presented the programme with Ted Lowe as commentator and John Williams as referee.

Notable players in the first championship include John Parrott, Neal Foulds and the two finalists Dean Reynolds and Dene O'Kane. Reynolds won the title 151–79 and soon turned professional afterwards.

Main draw

Qualifying round

Group 1

Group 2

Knockout stage

References

Pot Black
Snooker competitions in England
1981 in snooker
1981 in English sport